Star Wars: Force Collection is an action card game based on the Star Wars franchise, published by Konami for iOS and Android in 2013.

Reception

The game received "mixed" reviews according to the review aggregation website Metacritic.

References

External links
 

2013 video games
Action video games
Android (operating system) games
Digital card games
IOS games
Konami games
Space opera video games
Star Wars video games
Video games based on films
Video games developed in Japan